LOT Polish Airlines Flight 703 was a plane that crash-landed about  north of Rogóżno railway station, on 2 November 1988. In the accident one person was killed and several were seriously injured.

Flight 
The plane, an Antonov An-24W, registered SP-LTD, named "Dunajec", took off from Okęcie airport, Warsaw for regional flight 703 to Rzeszów-Jasionka Airport. It had 25 passengers on board (including the famous radio presenter Tomasz Beksiński) and four crew members. The captain was Kazimierz Rożek (with 30 years of experience) and the co-pilot was Waldemar Wolski. The emergency started about two minutes before the planned landing, at 10:25, when the plane was flying east to runway 27. According to officials, pilots turned on the anti-icing installation too late and, during approach, both engines immediately shut down because of icing of the engine intakes. Just after that, Rożek and Wolski, knowing that they would not reach the airport, started an emergency descent, which ended in a glade.

Crash-landing and evacuation 
The aircraft landed on a glade at high speed . It became airborne above a drainage ditch and crashed further on. In the moment of crash-landing, one person – a 69-year-old woman from Rzeszów – was killed. Within several seconds after the crash, two flight attendants and two militia officers evacuated all passengers from the aircraft, which quickly caught on fire.

Aftermath 
The crash-landing has been the last fatal air crash in Polish commercial aviation so far. It was one of the main reasons for which LOT Polish Airlines removed all An-24 served planes (this particular aircraft was 22 years old) and replaced them with ATR 42 and ATR 72.

References 
Lotnictwo.net.pl

External links
Photo of wreckage

1988 in Poland
703
Aviation accidents and incidents in Poland
Aviation accidents and incidents in 1988
November 1988 events in Europe
Accidents and incidents involving the Antonov An-24
Airliner accidents and incidents caused by engine failure
1988 disasters in Poland